This is a list of fossiliferous stratigraphic units in Wales.

See also

Lists of fossiliferous stratigraphic units in Europe
Lists of fossiliferous stratigraphic units in the United Kingdom

References
 

Wales
United Kingdom geology-related lists
Wales geography-related lists